Diamond Jubilee National Service of Thanksgiving may refer to:

 The service of thanksgiving held at St Paul's Cathedral to mark the Diamond Jubilee of Queen Victoria in 1897
 The service of thanksgiving held at St Paul's Cathedral to mark the Diamond Jubilee of Elizabeth II in 2012